Eduardo Neri  is one of the 81 municipalities of Guerrero, in south-western Mexico. The municipal capital is Zumpango del Río.  The municipality covers an area of 1289.6 km².

In 2005, the total population was 40,328.

Geography

Towns and villages
The municipality has 80 towns/villages. The largest are as follows:

Some 1,300 miners were blocked from entering the site. The ejiidatarios claim that the mining company, Equinox Gold, has racist and discriminatory policies, and that it regularly ignores health and environmental protections. Eight villagers in Carrizalillo died from cancer in 2019, and some babies have been born with deformities related to pollution. 

The mavericks claim that the company has had a racist and discriminatory attitude towards the inhabitants and has violated contract clauses related to the protection of health and the environment. Eight villagers died from last year, apparently from cancer and some babies were born with malformations from pollution. Twenty-one miners have been infected by COVID-19. Both the mining company and the landowners have been extorted into monthly payments by local criminal gangs. Section 17 of the Sindicato Nacional de Trabajadores Mineros, Metalúrgicos, Siderúrgicos y Similares de la República Mexicana (mineworkers' union), based in Taxco, has appealed to Governor Héctor Astudillo Flores.

References

Municipalities of Guerrero